Dorobanți is a neighborhood in Sector 1, Bucharest. The neighborhood is dominated by red brick buildings and glass buildings. Main intersections/squares are Perla, Dorobanți Square, Charles de Gaulle Square, and Quito Square. The district features many embassy buildings, and local cafés are regarded as meeting places of Bucharest's nouveau riche.

History
Calea Dorobanți is one of the oldest streets with heavy traffic in Bucharest. The area around the street was designed and built as an exclusive district. The current name was given to the street in 1878, after the Romanian War of Independence, as a tribute to the Romanian infantry troops (Dorobanți in Romanian) who fought at Pleven, Vidin and Grivitsa.

In 1947, the Zambaccian Museum was founded in the neighbourhood.

Borders
Dorobanți neighborhood is delimited in the south by Piața Romană, in the south-east by Mihai Eminescu Street, in the east by Polonă Street, Floreasca Avenue, and the Floreasca district, in the north-east by Primăverii neighborhood, in the north by Herăstrău neighborhood, in the west by Aviatorilor Avenue and Victory Square, and in the south-west by Lascăr Catargiu Avenue.

Transport
 There are four metro stations, one located in each corner of the neighborhood: Aviatorilor in the north; Victoriei on the west; Romană in the south; and Ștefan cel Mare in the east.
 Bucharest Transit Corporation (RATB) lines 331, 301, 131, 282, 182, 330, 684, 335, and 783 and a tram-line serve this district.

Gallery

References

Districts of Bucharest